An election to Cork County Council took place on 11 June 2004 as part of that year's Irish local elections. 48 councillors were elected from ten electoral divisions by PR-STV voting for a five-year term of office.

Results by party

Results by Electoral Area

Bandon

Bantry

Blarney

Carrigaline

Fermoy

Kanturk

Macroom

Mallow

Midleton

Skibbereen

External links
 Official website

2004 Irish local elections
2004